Belle Isle Marsh Reservation in East Boston, Suffolk County, Massachusetts is an urban nature preserve and public recreation area containing mostly coastal wetlands. The 350-acre (1.4 km2) Reservation includes the largest remaining salt marsh in the Boston area. The marsh also borders the towns of Revere and Winthrop.

It was once a Metropolitan District Commission reservation, but it is now run by the Massachusetts Department of Conservation and Recreation.  It is a reserve for a variety of flora and fauna.  Salt marshes were once prevalent along the Massachusetts Bay shoreline. The marsh is home to a wide variety of  saltmarsh plants, marine life, and birds. The reservation is managed by the Department of Conservation and Recreation.

History
Although it is now connected to the mainland, Belle Isle was formerly an actual island. It was granted in 1628 to William Brereton, who named it Susana Island in honor of his daughter. It was later referred to as Hog Island or Hogg Island on maps, before it was purchased by Joseph Russel near the end of the 18th century, who named it Belle Isle. In 1800, it was purchased by John Breed, who lived on the island, which was then referred to as Breed's Island. Part of the island is now developed as Orient Heights; much of the remainder is Belle Isle Marsh.

Activities and amenities
Features of the reservation include landscaped hiking paths, benches, an observation tower, and handicap access. A portion of the Boston Harborwalk runs through the reservation.

Gallery

References

External links

Belle Isle Marsh Reservation Department of Conservation and Recreation
Belle Isle Marsh Reservation Map Department of Conservation and Recreation
Friends of Belle Isle Marsh

State parks of Massachusetts
Parks in Boston
East Boston
Protected areas established in 1985
1985 establishments in Massachusetts